Armando Contreras Palma (born April 14, 1947) is a Salvadoran football manager who created a legacy in El Salvador by winning three Primera División titles with Atlético Marte.
He has also coached three El Salvador national football teams, most recently in 2004.

Titles

References

External links
Palma signs contract with Vista Hermosa 

1947 births
Living people
People from San Miguel, El Salvador
Salvadoran football managers
El Salvador national football team managers